Sven Ottke (born 3 June 1967) is a German former professional boxer who competed from 1997 to 2004. He was a unified super-middleweight world champion, having held the IBF title from 1998 to 2004, and the WBA (Unified) title from 2003 to 2004. With 21 successful title defences, Ottke was the fourth European boxer to retire as an undefeated world champion, after Jack McAuliffe, Terry Marsh, and Michael Loewe; Joe Calzaghe later became the fifth. Ottke defended the title against 20 boxers, a record in the super-middleweight division shared with Joe Calzaghe. As an amateur, Ottke won a bronze medal in the middleweight division at the 1989 World Championships.

Early life
Sven Ottke served two apprenticeships as a plasterer and industrial clerk. He became a member of the boxing club Spandauer BC 26 Berlin at the age of 14.

Amateur career
He rebutted his critics, which had complained that he had started too late, when he became German Champion at the age of 18 at Middleweight. Ten further titles would follow. He took part in the 1988, 1992 and 1996 Olympic Games . He became European Champion in 1991 and 1996, and came third in 1993.

Ottke held amateur wins over Antonio Tarver, Chris Byrd, Michael Moorer, Zsolt Erdei and Juan Carlos Gómez.
Amateur Record: 256-47-5
German Middleweight Champion (FRG) 1985–1989
German National Middleweight Champion (1990–1991, 1995–1996)
German National Light Heavyweight Champion (1992–1993)
Three time Olympian

Ottke finished his amateur career with a record of 256 wins, 47 losses (at least 4 by knockout,) 5 draws. As his professional career, he spent most of his amateur career within Germany. Of a few World Championships and Summer Olympics, which he participated in, Ottke did not manage to pass the quarterfinals (apart from the Moscow 1989, where he was dropped out of the semifinals.)

Professional career
After 308 fights as an amateur, of which he won 256, he turned professional in 1997. Less than a year later on 24 October 1998, he won the IBF super middleweight championship from Charles Brewer via a disputed decision victory. After this he made 16 successful defenses of his IBF title against fighters such as Thomas Tate (twice), Glen Johnson, Silvio Branco, James Butler, Anthony Mundine, Charles Brewer in a rematch, and a controversial points win against Robin Reid. He was at the peak of his career when he won the WBA title on 13 March 2003 against WBA champion Byron Mitchell, winning by split points decision.

After successfully defending his title 21 times, Ottke stepped down as undefeated world champion on 27 March 2004. Ottke has a record of 34 wins and 0 losses as a professional, of which 6 were by knockout. He was named IBF "Fighter of the Year" in 2003.

Ottke was a durable and attritional fighter, with most of his wins coming by points decisions rather than knockout.

Notably, Ottke refused to defend his title outside Germany, and referees and ringside officials were often German. It has been alleged that both the refereeing and some of the points decisions were biased, with many commentators in the Reid fight, in particular, commenting that it was some of the worst refereeing decisions that had seen and alleged corrupt judging being the only reason Ottke keeping his title. Reid, if he had won, had stated his intention to pursue a rematch against old foe Joe Calzaghe: the latter, holding the WBO belt, called out Ottke instead for a unification title match, but Ottke took only one more fight and then retired.

Planned comeback
In May 2008, a comeback was planned against Dariusz Michalczewski in Germany, but the match never materialized.

Professional boxing record

Television viewership

Germany

References

External links
 
 
 Amateur record

1967 births
Living people
Boxers from Berlin
Middleweight boxers
Light-heavyweight boxers
World Boxing Association champions
International Boxing Federation champions
Boxers at the 1988 Summer Olympics
Boxers at the 1992 Summer Olympics
Boxers at the 1996 Summer Olympics
Olympic boxers of West Germany
Olympic boxers of Germany
German male boxers
AIBA World Boxing Championships medalists
World super-middleweight boxing champions
Undefeated world boxing champions
Ich bin ein Star – Holt mich hier raus! participants